Robert Henry Kramer (April 23, 1922 – September 24, 1978) was an American professional basketball player. He played for the Oshkosh All-Stars and the Youngstown Bears in the National Basketball League and averaged 2.3 points per game.

References

External links
Hammond Sports Hall of Fame profile

1922 births
1978 deaths
United States Army personnel of World War II
American men's basketball players
Basketball players from Indiana
Forwards (basketball)
Guards (basketball)
Oshkosh All-Stars players
Sportspeople from Hammond, Indiana
Youngstown Bears players